The Liberals of Serbia (abbr. ЛС, LS) was a political party in Serbia.

History
The party was founded in 1990 when the Social Democratic Youth League reconstituted itself as Movement for Serbia – New Democracy. The party was renamed to just New Democracy in March 1993.

In the 1993 election, when the Socialist Party of Serbia lost its majority in parliament, New Democracy, which had previously belonged to the DEPOS, supported the socialists in gaining a parliamentary majority necessary to form a government, citing Milošević's commitment to securing a peace plan for Bosnia and Herzegovina. In 1998, New Democracy left the government and was replaced by the Serbian Radical Party.

In 2000, New Democracy was a part of the Democratic Opposition of Serbia (DOS) coalition, the candidate of which, Vojislav Koštunica, won the 2000 presidential elections. At the parliamentary election in the same year, the party was part of the same coalition and participated in the government which was formed by DOS. In 2003 the party was renamed Liberals of Serbia.

At the parliamentary election on 28 December 2003 Liberals of Serbia put up as candidates the former Serbian Interior Minister Dušan Mihajlović and the former Chief of Serbian Police, General Sreten Lukić, the latter indicted for war crimes in the International Criminal Tribunal for the Former Yugoslavia. The party won 0.7% of the popular vote and no seats.

In October 2005 Mihajlović stepped down and Radivoje Lazarević, former Yugoslav ambassador to Brazil, took over as party president.

In 2010, acting president of the party, Miroslav Stefanović, was fined 150.000 RSD for falsely accusing Vladimir Beba Popović of being responsible for the assassination of Zoran Đinđić in 2007.

The party ceased to exist in 2010.

Electoral performance

Parliamentary elections

Federal elections

See also
Liberalism in Serbia
Serbian Liberal Party

References

External links
Official webpage 

1991 establishments in Serbia
2010 disestablishments in Serbia
Defunct political parties in Serbia
Liberal parties in Serbia
Political parties disestablished in 2010
Political parties established in 1991
Pro-European political parties in Serbia